Graham Cooper (born 1989) is an Australian professional rugby union referee.

Refereeing career
He has been a member of Rugby Australia's match officials panel since 2015, having previously refereed in Western Australia and worked in development for Rugby WA. In 2017, he was selected to officiate the 2017 Women's Rugby World Cup. He was appointed to the officiating list for the 2021 Super Rugby AU season in February 2021.

References

1989 births
Australian rugby union referees
Living people
ARU referees
Super Rugby referees
Sportsmen from Western Australia